The 2009–10 Premier League was West Ham United's fifth consecutive season in the Premier League, following a ninth-placed finish in the 2008–09 Premier League. They were managed by Gianfranco Zola - in his second season after replacing Alan Curbishley in September 2008.

Season summary 
The Hammers won their first Premier League game of the season against Wolverhampton Wanderers at Molineux, but failed to win another until early November after an injury time winner from Zavon Hines sealed an upset victory against Aston Villa.

The Upton Park riots took place in West Ham's first Football League Cup game on 25 August against fierce rivals Millwall. The club was fined £115,000 after pitch invasions and brawling, resulting in a Millwall fan being stabbed. West Ham won the game 3–1 after extra time.

On 19 January 2010, former Birmingham City owners David Gold and David Sullivan completed a joint takeover of West Ham United from cash-strapped Icelandic owner Björgólfur Guðmundsson.

West Ham's mid-season form was patchy, but a loss at Old Trafford began a string of six consecutive losses to put them in relegation danger. The run was broken by a late equaliser in a 2–2 draw at Everton, followed by a 1–0 win at home against Sunderland. Another poor game at Anfield was a minor hiccup in West Ham's quest for survival, as they then earned three points against Wigan Athletic in a hard-fought 3–2 win. Simultaneously, Hull City blew an opportunity against Sunderland, losing 1–0. West Ham's Premier League status was confirmed on 3 May with Hull's 2–2 draw with Wigan, which left them five points behind West Ham with one game left to play.

West Ham's away record of only one away win all season equalled their lowest number of away wins for a season, previously set in 1960–61.
On 11 May 2010, two days after the end of the season, the club announced the termination of their manager Gianfranco Zola's contract with immediate effect.

Final league table

First-team squad

Out on loan

Results

Pre season 
West Ham took part in a pre-season training camp in Austria and Slovenia, and had scheduled four pre-season games; however, the game against Bundesliga side Werder Bremen was called off due to wet weather. West Ham also took place in the 2009 Barclays Asia Trophy, where they finished third.

2009 Barclays Asia Trophy

Premier League

League Cup

FA Cup

Statistics

Overview

Goalscorers

League position by matchday

Appearances and goals 

|-
! colspan=12 style=background:#dcdcdc; text-align:center| Goalkeepers

|-
! colspan=12 style=background:#dcdcdc; text-align:center| Defenders

|-
! colspan=12 style=background:#dcdcdc; text-align:center| Midfielders

|-
! colspan=12 style=background:#dcdcdc; text-align:center| Forwards

|}

Transfers

In

Out

References

External links 
 West Ham United FC Official Website
 2009–10 West Ham United F.C. season at ESPN
 

West Ham United
West Ham United F.C. seasons
2009 sports events in London
2010 sports events in London